The Liberal Democratic Federation of Hong Kong (abbreviated 自民聯; LDF) was a pro-Beijing pro-business and conservative political party in Hong Kong. It was established in 1990, and was composed of mainly conservative businessmen and professionals. It contested in the District Board elections, Urban and Regional Council elections and the first Legislative Council election in 1991 against the liberal United Democrats of Hong Kong (UDHK). It was merged into the Hong Kong Progressive Alliance in 1997. Chaired by Hu Fa-kuang and vice-chaired by Maria Tam and Philip Kwok, the leading figures included Tso Wung-wai, Howard Young, and Daniel Heung.

History
The party was established by a group of conservative businesspeople and professionals in the Hong Kong Basic Law Consultative Committee (BLCC), Hong Kong Basic Law Drafting Committee (BLDC), which was often called the "Group of 89", and appointed members in the Legislative Council of Hong Kong (LegCo) who worried about welfare spending and adversarial on 6 November 1990, as the reaction to the liberals forming the United Democrats of Hong Kong (UDHK) on the eve of the first direct LegCo elections. The objective of party was to support candidates to fun in the upcoming elections. Due to lack of popular basis and experience, the group invited Maria Tam Wai-chu, member of the Executive and Legislative Councils and her Progressive Hong Kong Society (PHKS) to join, as well as four councillors from the Hong Kong Civic Association. Hu Fa-kuang became the founding Chairman, while Maria Tam and Philip Kwok Chi-kuen the founding Vice-Chairmen.

The party won 24 seats in the 1991 District Board elections, 3 seats in the 1991 Urban and Regional Councils elections and 3 seats in the 1991 LegCo elections of which were all from functional constituencies. The party's pro-Beijing and business-oriented images faced competition from new parties the Beijing-loyalist Democratic Alliance for the Betterment of Hong Kong (DAB) and pro-business Liberal Party established in 1992 and 1993 respectively. All three LegCo members, Ngai Shiu-kit, Howard Young and Peter Wong left the party for the Liberal Party in 1993.

The party gained back 1 seat in 1995 LegCo elections from the Election Committee with David Chu Yu-lin. In 1997, the party was merged into another pro-business pro-Beijing party Hong Kong Progressive Alliance.

Former LegCo members
 Michael Cheng
 David Chu
 Chung Pui-lam
 Ngai Shiu-kit
 Maria Tam
 James Tien
 Alfred Tso
 Peter Wong
 Howard Young

Election performance

Legislative Council elections

Municipal elections

District Board elections

See also
 Politics of Hong Kong
 List of political parties in Hong Kong

References 

1990 establishments in Hong Kong
1997 disestablishments in Hong Kong
Conservative parties in Hong Kong
Defunct political parties in Hong Kong
Political parties disestablished in 1997
Political parties established in 1990